Ataxia prolixa is a species of beetle in the family Cerambycidae. It was described by Henry Walter Bates in 1866. It is known from French Guiana and Brazil.

References

Ataxia (beetle)
Beetles described in 1866